Naz is the Turkish word for "coy" or "cute". It is a popular feminine given name in Pakistan , Azerbayjan and Turkey. Naz is also used as a synonym for pride.
Notable people with the name include:

Given name
 Naz Aydemir (born 1990), Turkish volleyball player
 Naz Ikramullah, British-Canadian artist
 Naz Osmanoglu (born 1985), British-Turkish comedian
 Naz Reid (born 1999), American basketball player
 Naz Shah (born 1973), British politician
 Naz Shahrokh (born 1969), Iranian-born visual artist

Middle name
 Anila Naz Chowdhury (born 1975), Bangladeshi singer
 Ayça Naz İhtiyaroğlu (born 1984), Turkish volleyball player

Surname
 Rasheed Naz (1948–2022), Pakistani film and television actor

Nickname
 Naseem Hamed, former British professional boxer
 Nazem Kadri, professional ice hockey player